Tleson (active around 555-535 BC) was an Attic potter and perhaps also a vase painter in the black-figure style. 
He was the son of the famous potter Nearchos and brother of Ergoteles.
His workshop apparently produced mostly Little-master cups. Most of his vases were painted by the Tleson Painter, whose real name is unknown, and whose conventional name is derived from Tleson. Based on the fact that vases known by that hand so far are only ever signed by Tleson, John Beazley suggested that Tleson and the Tleson painter may be identical. There is no proof for this hypothesis. Some of Tleson's pots were painted by other artists, such as Oltos and the Centaur Painter.

Selected works 
Where no painter is named, the vases were painted by the Tleson painter
Athens, Agora Museum
Fragment of a Little-master cup P 13349
Athens, National Museum
Pyxis 502 • Fragment of a Little-master cup Acr. 613 • Fragment of a Little-master cup Acr. 1567 • Fragment of a Little-master cup Acr. 1570 • Fragment of a Band cup AP 501
Basel, Antikenmuseum und Sammlung Ludwig
Cup BS 405
Berlin, Antikensammlung
 Little-master cup F 1760
Bonn, Akademisches Kunstmuseum
Little-master cup 53
Boston, Museum of Fine Arts
 Fragment of a Little-master cup 03.851 • Little-master cup 92.2655 • Cup 98.920 • Fragment of a Little-master cup F 357.2
Braunschweig, Herzog Anton Ulrich-Museum
 Fragment of a Little-master cup 495
Brussels, Royal Museums of Fine Arts of Belgium
 Little-master cup R 385 B • Little-master cup R 385 C
Bryn Mawr, Bryn Mawr College
 Fragment of a Little-master cup P 175
Compiègne, Musée Vivenel
 Little-master cup 1091
Dresden, Albertinum
 Little-master cup ZV 2714
Erlangen, Friedrich-Alexander-Universität
 Fragment of a Little-master cup 837
Göttingen, Georg-August-Universität
 Fragment of a Little-master cup 66
Heidelberg, Ruprecht-Karls-Universität
 Fragment of a Litt Fragment of a Little-master cup Fragment einer Kleinmeisterschale S 30 • Fragment of a Little-master cup S 31
Izmir, Archaeologiocal Museum Izmir
 Fragment of a Little-master cup 49 A
Karlsruhe, Badisches Landesmuseum
 Little-master cup HC 1419 (Centaur Painter)
Leipzig, Antikenmuseum der Universität Leipzig
 Little-master cup T 52 • Fragment of a cup T 433
London, British Museum
 Little-master cup 1867.5-8.946 • Little-master cup B 410 • Little-master cup B 411 • Cup B 420 • Cup B 421
Malibu, J. Paul Getty Museum
 Little-master cup 76.AE.90 • Little-master cup 80.AE.99.3
Manchester, City Art Gallery & Museum
Band cup 111H51
Moscow, State Historical Museum
 Little-master cup
Munich, Antikensammlung
 Little-master cup 2126 • Little-master cup 2127 • Little-master cup 2149 • Fragment of a Little-master cup 9413 (Painter unknown) • Fragment of a Little-master cup 9417 (Painter unknown) • Band cup SL 462
Naples, Museo Archeologico Nazionale
Fragment of a cup 81338 (Oltos) • Little-master cup H 2528 • Little-master cup Stg 271
New York, Metropolitan Museum of Art
 Little-master cup 27.122.30 • Band cup GR 542
Nicosia, Cyprus Museum
 Little-master cup C 438
Oxford, Ashmolean Museum
 Fragment of a Little-master cup 1953.11 • Fragment of a Little-master cup 1953.12 • Little-master cup G 137.35
Paris, Bibliotheque Nationale, Cabinet des Medailles
 Little-master cup 317
Paris, Musée National du Louvre
 Little-master cup F 86
Rome, Museo Nazionale di Villa Giulia
 Little-master cup M 608
St. Petersburg, Hermitage Museum
 Little-master cup
Syracuse, Museo archeologico regionale Paolo Orsi
 Little-master cup 43985
Taranto, Taranto, Museo Archeologico Nazionale
 Little-master cup 4440
Toledo, Toledo Museum of Art
Cup 1958.70
Vatican, Museo Gregoriano Etrusco
 Little-master cup 322 • Fragment of a band cup AST 345
Warsaw, Muzeum Narodowe
Band cup 147262
Washington, National Museum of Natural History
 Little-master cup 42207 A (Painter unknown)
Würzburg, Martin-von-Wagner-Museum
 Little-master cup L 409

Bibliography 
 John D. Beazley: Attic Black-Figure Vase-Painters, Oxford 1956
 Berthold Fellmann: Zur Chronologie des Tleson Malers. In: Vasenforschung und „Corpus Vasorum Antiquorum“. Standortbestimmung und Perspektiven, München 2002, p. 111-121.

External links 
 Dictionary of Art
 Short biography Getty Museum

Ancient Greek potters
Artists of ancient Attica
6th-century BC Athenians